Domašín is a municipality and village in Chomutov District in the Ústí nad Labem Region of the Czech Republic. It has about 200 inhabitants.

Administrative parts
Villages and hamlets of Louchov, Nová Víska and Petlery are administrative parts of Domašín.

References

Villages in Chomutov District
Villages in the Ore Mountains